The Silly Sisters is an English folk music duo, formed in 1976 by Maddy Prior and June Tabor.

History 
Initially they performed together under their own names, and as such released their first album, Silly Sisters, later taking this name as the name of their duo. As such they released a subsequent album No More to the Dance in 1988.

In 2009 the song Hedger and Ditcher from No More to the Dance was included in the Topic Records 70 year anniversary boxed set Three Score and Ten as track seventeen on the seventh CD.

Discography 
 1976: Silly Sisters (as "Maddy Prior & June Tabor")
 1988: No More To The Dance

External links 
 Silly Sisters at allmusic.com

English folk musical groups
English musical duos
Folk music duos